John David Hayward (1929–2007) was a British stained glass artist who made nearly 200 windows in churches and cathedrals across Britain and abroad.

Early life
Hayward was born in Tooting, London into a Methodist family. His father, David Hayward, was a printer and church organist. He was educated at Tooting Bec Grammar School (now Ernest Bevin Academy) and developed a talent for painting and drawing. After school, he enrolled at St Martin's School of Art.

After leaving St. Martin's, Hayward received an offer from Royal College of Art, but he instead joined Faith Craft, a company that designed ecclesiastical furniture. He remained there for 18 years before setting up his own practice as a stained glass artist. His first major commission was a set of ruined windows of the Christopher Wren church, St Mary-le-Bow, which had been damaged in the Second World War.

List of Works (incomplete)
 Sherborne Abbey, Sherborne, Dorset
 St. Matthew's Church, Camberwell, Greater London
 St Mary-le-Bow, Cheapside, Greater London
 Church of St. Peter and St. Paul, Edgefield, Norfolk
 Shrine of Our Lady, Walsingham, Norfolk
 St. Richard's Church, Haywards Heath, West Sussex

Gallery

References

External links

 Church Times obituary
 John Hayward designs - gallery

British stained glass artists and manufacturers
People from Tooting
2007 deaths
1929 births
Alumni of Saint Martin's School of Art